Špilár is a Slovak surname. Notable people with the surname include:

Gabriel Spilar, formerly Špilár, (born 1980) Slovak ice hockey player
Marek Špilár (1975–2013) Slovak football player

Slovak-language surnames